Proxenus miranda, the miranda moth or glistening rustic, is a moth of the  family Noctuidae. It is found in most of North America, where it has been recorded south through California to Arizona and in the Rocky Mountains to Colorado in the west. In the east it is found from southern Canada to South Carolina, Tennessee and Texas. The habitat consists of moist, open forests and grasslands.

The wingspan is about 23–27 mm. The forewings are glistening sooty or brownish black with a small black point marking the orbicular and reniform spots. The hindwings are white, gradually darkening on the outer third. Adults are on wing from May to October in two generations per year.

The larvae feed on various herbaceous plants, including Taraxacum, Fragaria and Medicago species.

References

Moths described in 1873
Caradrinini
Moths of North America